Hoar may refer to:

 Hoar (Forgotten Realms), a fictional Faerûnian deity in Dungeons & Dragons
 Hoar (surname)
 Hoar Construction, a heavy construction company headquartered in Birmingham, Alabama
 Hoar frost
 Depth hoar, a large crystal occurring at the base of a snowpack

See also
 Hoare
 Whore (disambiguation)